National Taitung Junior College (NTC) is a public college located in Taitung City, Taitung County, Taiwan.

NTJC offers a variety of programs in different fields such as Tourism, Hospitality, Business Administration, Applied English, Information Management, and Early Childhood Education. The college has two schools, the School of Hospitality and Tourism and the School of Business Administration and Information Management, which offer a range of associate degree programs.

History
NTC was founded as Taitung Agricultural Extension School in 1928. In 2006, the school changed its name to National Taitung Junior College.

Faculties

Junior College
 Department of Horticulture
 Department of Hospitality Management
 Department of Architecture
 Department of Power Mechanical Engineering
 Department of Information Management
 Department of Food Science and Technology
 Department of Culture-Based Creative Design
 Department of Electrical Engineering

Senior Vocational High School
 Department of Electrical Engineering
 Department of Auto Mechanics
 Department of Interior Space Design
 Department of Architecture
 Department of Home Economics
 Department of Fowl and Livestock Health Care
 Department of Agricultural Machinery Engineering
 Department of Computer Engineering
 Department of Machinery

See also
 List of universities in Taiwan

References

External links
  

1928 establishments in Taiwan
Educational institutions established in 1928
Junior colleges in Taiwan
Universities and colleges in Taitung County
Universities and colleges in Taiwan
Technical universities and colleges in Taiwan